Tomoip is an Oceanic language of New Britain in Papua New Guinea.

External links 
 Paradisec has the Malcolm Ross collection (MR1), which includes Tomoip language materials.

References

Meso-Melanesian languages
Languages of East New Britain Province
Languages of West New Britain Province